Clarence Alfred Gilyard Jr. (December 24, 1955 – November 28, 2022) was an American university professor, actor, and author. As a performer, he appeared in film, television, and stage productions; some sources give his middle name as Alfred.

Gilyard was known for his roles as second private investigator and right-hand man Conrad McMasters to Ben Matlock (played by Andy Griffith) on the legal drama series Matlock from 1989 to 1993; Pastor Bruce Barnes in the first two Left Behind movies; Cordell Walker's (played by Chuck Norris) Texas Ranger partner, James "Jimmy" Trivette, in the 1990s crime drama Walker, Texas Ranger; Theo, the terrorist computer expert in Die Hard; and Lieutenant (junior grade) Marcus "Sundown" WIlliams  in Top Gun.

Early life and education
Gilyard was born into a military family in Moses Lake, Washington, on Christmas Eve, in 1955, the son of Barbara and Clarence Alfred Gilyard Sr., a U.S. Air Force officer. Gilyard was the second of six children. His family was originally from New Orleans, Louisiana, but Gilyard grew up on Air Force bases in Hawaii, Texas, and Florida. Raised primarily as a Lutheran, he became Catholic in the 1990s.

During his young adulthood, Gilyard lived in the San Bernardino suburb of Rialto, California, and attended Eisenhower High School. He was an excellent student, graduating in 1974, and afterward spent a year as an Air Force Academy cadet before leaving the service to attend Sterling College. In college, he played football, and became a member of the Sigma Chi fraternity. He also received a tennis scholarship, but dropped out of school before completing his studies.

While living with his parents in high school, Gilyard was preoccupied with women, alcohol, and occasionally, drugs. His parents urged him to move out, so he relocated to Long Beach, California, with a friend. He attended California State University, Long Beach, majoring in acting, and worked as a waiter while seeking acting opportunities. He completed his bachelor's degree at California State University, Dominguez Hills.

Gilyard worked with a housemate at a clothing store, where he was promoted to manager. He left this to work briefly selling industrial chemicals. In 2003, Gilyard returned to school, receiving a Master of Fine Arts in theatre performance at Southern Methodist University.

Career

Actor
In 1979, Gilyard moved to Los Angeles to become an actor. Among other work, a role in the play Bleacher Bums made him what one magazine called "the first black actor to play a cheerleader", before he segued into television roles. As a character actor, Gilyard made guest appearances on TV shows such as Diff'rent Strokes, The Facts of Life, 227, Simon & Simon, and Riptide. In 1982–1983, Gilyard was cast in the final season of the NBC TV series CHiPs as Officer Benjamin Webster, opposite Erik Estrada. He co-starred with Jim Carrey in the 1984 NBC sitcom The Duck Factory. He appeared in a commercial for McDonald's in 1987.

Gilyard's movie debut in 1986 was as an F-14 Tomcat radar intercept officer, LT.(JG) Marcus "Sundown" Williams, in Top Gun. He was also a military man in the 1986 film The Karate Kid Part II. He appeared in the 1988 action film Die Hard as Theo, a criminal computer expert. He also appeared as Reverend Bruce Barnes in Left Behind: The Movie and its sequel, Left Behind II: Tribulation Force.

Gilyard played the role of Ben Matlock's private investigator, Conrad McMasters, on Matlock opposite Andy Griffith from 1989 to 1993. He replaced Kene Holliday, who was fired for his dependency on drugs and alcohol. Gilyard appeared in almost every Matlock episode starting in season 3 of the show. When the show moved from NBC to ABC for the series' seventh season, production moved from Los Angeles to Wilmington, North Carolina. Andy Griffith suggested to Gilyard that he move there, too, which he did, before departing to work on a pilot for another series at CBS the following year.

In 1993, he began another long-time co-starring role opposite Chuck Norris on Walker, Texas Ranger. Gilyard portrayed fellow Texas Ranger and best friend of Walker, James "Jimmy" Trivette. Gilyard had a cameo appearance in the 2005 television movie, Walker, Texas Ranger: Trial by Fire.

In 2012, after taking time off to teach, Gilyard began appearing onscreen again, mostly in independent projects. In 2014, he appeared in the religious film A Matter of Faith.

On January 17, 2016, Gilyard performed the role of Hoak Colburn onstage at the University of New Mexico's Popejoy Hall in the Neil Simon Festival's Driving Miss Daisy, opposite his former Walker, Texas Ranger co-star, Sheree J. Wilson.

In the 2018 edition of the football video game Madden NFL, Gilyard plays high school coach Devin Wade in the "Longshot" section of the game. Two years later, Gilyard reprised his role as criminal gang member Theo from Die Hard, alongside star Bruce Willis, in a commercial for Advance Auto Parts' DieHard brand of car batteries.

Professor
In 2006 Gilyard took a break from acting and became an associate professor in the College of Fine Arts – Department of Theatre at the University of Nevada, Las Vegas, where he taught stage and screen acting. He continued to teach  for many years.  Following his death, the school's film chair said "Professor Gilyard was a beacon of light and strength for everyone around at UNLV".

Personal life and death
Gilyard was married twice and had six children. His first marriage, to Catherine Dutko in 1989, ended in divorce, and he married his second wife, Elena Castillo, in 2001. He served as the consultant of the communications committee of the United States Conference of Catholic Bishops.

After a long illness, Gilyard died at his home in Las Vegas, Nevada, on November 28, 2022, at the age of 66.

Filmography

Film

Television

Bibliography
 The Dance of the Star (1990)
 Instructors and Students (1992)
 Eagle in a Cage (1996)
 Perfume at Night (1997)
 Melancholy in the Mirror (2002)
 Past and Present: My Story (2005)
 The Game of Venus (2006)
 Memories of a Stranger Wanderer (2008)
 Cry of the Cat (2010)
 Red Lights (2011)

References

External links
 
 Clarence Gilyard Net Worth

1955 births
2022 deaths
20th-century African-American people
20th-century American male actors
21st-century African-American people
21st-century American male actors
African-American Catholics
African-American male actors
American male film actors
American male stage actors
American male television actors
California State University, Dominguez Hills alumni
Catholics from California
Catholics from Washington (state)
Converts to Roman Catholicism from Lutheranism
Male actors from Washington (state)
People from Moses Lake, Washington
People from Rialto, California
Southern Methodist University alumni
Sterling College alumni
United States Air Force Academy alumni
University of Nevada, Las Vegas faculty